The Ugly Duckling is an audiobook of the classic 1843 fairy tale of the same name by Hans Christian Andersen. It is narrated by American singer-actress Cher, and was released in 1987 by Windham Hill Records.

Track listing
Part 1
"Sheebeg Sheemore"
"Lullabye"
"The Munster Cloak"
"Ode to Whiskey"
"Three Ravens"
"Down by the Sea"

Part 2
"Three Ravens"
"Mrs. Judge"
"Down by the Sea"
"Carolan's Ramble To Cashel"
"Carolan's Farewell To Music"
"Dark Woman Of The Glen"
"Sheebeg Sheemore"

Production
Hans Christian Andersen: Author
Cher: Narrator
Joan Jeanrenaud: Cello
Mark Sottnick: Producer
Daniel Drasin: Producer
Patrick Drasin: Arranger, Producer
Patrick Ball: Arranger, Composer, Harp

Works based on The Ugly Duckling
Cher albums
Spoken word albums by American artists
1987 soundtrack albums
Windham Hill Records soundtracks
Audiobooks by title or series